The Unlikely Murderer is a 2021 Swedish crime drama streaming television series written by Wilhelm Behrman and Niklas Rockström. The series was praised for "its fine observations of male pride turned toxic" in The Guardian. Based on real-life events, the series is adapted from the 2018 novel The Unlikely Murderer, written by Thomas Pettersson, who worked as a writer on the show. It was reported in November 2021 that distributor Netflix is being sued for defamation for the show's representation of events.

Cast
 Robert Gustafsson as Stig Engström
 Eva Melander as Margareta Engström
 Björn Bengtsson as Thomas Pettersson
 Magnus Krepper as Harry Levin
 Joel Spira as Lennart Granström
 Peter Viitanen as Olof Palme
 Cilla Thorell as Lisbeth Palme
 Bengt Braskered as Anders Skandiakollega
 Cia Eriksson as Kvinnlig väktare Skandia

References

External links
 
 

Crime television films
Swedish-language Netflix original programming

Television series based on actual events
Assassination of Olof Palme